The Family Values Tour was an annual rock and hip hop tour held by the American nu metal band Korn since 1998. The first tour took place in 1998 and the second tour in 1999, but the tour took a hiatus in 2000 due to heavy competition from the Anger Management Tour, the Summer Sanitarium Tour, and others. The Family Values Tour happened again in 2001 before taking another hiatus, this time for four years. The Family Values Tour returned in 2006 with Korn and Deftones as the headliners. Another tour occurred in 2007, before taking another hiatus until 2013. In 2013 the event took place for the final time as a one-day music festival instead of the traditional tour under the name "Family Values Festival".

History

Family Values Tour 1998

Korn, Limp Bizkit, Ice Cube, Incubus (who replaced Ice Cube on October 25, 1998 for the four remaining dates), Orgy, and Rammstein.

In one of the more infamous moments, Rammstein's band members were all dragged off stage by police and subsequently arrested during their Halloween performance. Each band decided to dress up while Rammstein were barely dressed at all, with most members performing in their underwear. Their lead guitarist Richard Kruspe was the only one decently dressed-he wore a wedding dress. The band had to spend the night in jail on charges of indecent exposure.

Ice Cube replacement
On October 25, 1998 due to the beginning of shooting the movie Next Friday, Ice Cube was replaced by alternative band Incubus for the remaining four dates. The band is featured on the Family Values Tour '98 CD release with the song "New Skin" and can be also seen during performance of "All in the Family" on the DVD release.

Feud with Rob Zombie
Therefore, Rob Zombie was replaced by German industrial metal act Rammstein. 

However, the official explanation was somewhat confusing. The Firm, Korn's management, said Zombie continually expressed dissatisfaction over not wanting to work with a hip hop act on the bill and was supposedly lectured by Rob Zombie's management that "rock kids don't like hip-hop." Rob Zombie's manager Andy Gould said those comments were false. He explained that Zombie had never even spoken to Korn, so he could not have made those comments. 

Although the statement released by Korn's management resulted in anger, Rob Zombie shared no bad blood with the bands participating in the Family Values Tour. In 1999, both Rob Zombie and Korn got on good terms again and launched the highly successful "Rock is Dead" tour together. Korn also toured with Rob Zombie in the summer of 2016.

Family Values Tour 1999

Headliners: 
 Limp Bizkit
 Filter
 Staind

On select dates:
 Korn (from October 5 to October 13)
 The Crystal Method (first part of the tour until the October 13 tour date)
 Mobb Deep (first part of the tour until the October 8 tour date)
 Run-DMC (started on September 24 as a surprise guest until October 3)
 Primus (second part of the tour, started on the October 13 tour date)
 Method Man and Redman (second part of the tour, started on the October 16 date)
 Sevendust (replaced Filter on the October 23 tour date)

Korn did not take a full part in the tour, instead making surprise appearances at a handful of dates.

Insane Clown Posse and System of a Down were originally scheduled for the tour but did not make the final roster. Controversy arose over System of a Down’s cancelled appearance, with speculation arising to believe Fred Durst had removed the band due to a falling out with the band Taproot after failing to negotiate them a record contract. After things had soured with Durst, System of a Down aided the band in securing a more satisfactory contract. Methods of Mayhem was also offered to take part of the tour.

DMX and Ja Rule were also on the bill for the first half of the tour, but cancelled all the shows prior to the beginning of the tour. Mobb Deep and Run-DMC became their replacements on the tour.

Sevendust filled in for Filter on the Denver date while Filter took time off to film the video for "Take a Picture".

It was during this tour that Staind's frontman Aaron Lewis, alongside Limp Bizkit's Fred Durst, performed the emotional hit single "Outside" for the first time in Biloxi, Mississippi. This live version quickly found widespread radio play before being recorded in the studio for Staind's next album Break the Cycle. Footage of this on-stage performance also was used for the song's music video.

Dates

Family Values Tour 2001
Bands taking part in the 2001 tour were Stone Temple Pilots, Linkin Park, Staind, Static-X, Deadsy, and Spike 1000 (replacing Deadsy on only first five dates).

Dates

Family Values Tour 2006 

Korn, Deftones, Stone Sour, Flyleaf, Dir En Grey, 10 Years, Deadsy, Bury Your Dead, Bullets and Octane, and Walls of Jericho

Controversies
In 2006, a violent fight allegedly broke out in the mosh pit at the Family Values Tour in Atlanta, Georgia during the Deftones performance, resulting in the death of 30-year-old Andy Richardson on August 1, 2006. Lawyers representing Mr. Richardson's family said they may pursue civil actions against Korn and the show's promoters.

Andy's mother, Gloria Richardson, said in a statement to Fox News Service on August 1, 2006 that "It's not right that someone could go to a concert for a good time and wind up dead. There needs to be more security or they need to not have these concerts at all". One week later, 24-year-old Michael Scott Axley was arrested and charged with Richardson's murder. Witnesses claim Axley punched Richardson, causing his head to hit the concrete floor and suffer an injury that ultimately proved  fatal.

Family Values Tour 2007
Main Stage: Korn, Evanescence, Atreyu, Flyleaf, Hellyeah, Trivium, Neurosonic

Side Stage: Droid, Five Finger Death Punch, Through You, Invitro, Twin Method, and Bloodsimple

Family Values Festival 2013
On August 30, 2013 Korn revealed to Billboard that they were bringing the tour back as a one-day event festival. On September 3, 2013, it was revealed that the Family Values Festival would take place in Broomfield, CO at the 1stBank Center.

Korn, Hollywood Undead, Asking Alexandria, Machine Gun Kelly, Beware of Darkness, and Love and Death

CD and DVD releases

 The Family Values Tour 1999
 The Family Values Tour 2001
 Family Values Tour 2006

The initial edition of Family Values Tour was highly successful and it was documented on separate DVD and CD releases, both put on sale on March 30, 1999 via Immortal/Epic Records. The CD release achieved gold record status in the United States while the DVD release went platinum.

See also

References

 
Heavy metal festivals in the United States
Music festivals established in 1998
Concert tours of Canada
Concert tours of the United States